Sultana Rezwan Chowdhury ( – 25 December 2019) was a Bangladeshi  politician from Thakurgaon belonging to Jatiya Party. She was a member of the Jatiya Sangsad.

Biography
Chowdhury was the daughter of Haji Mohammad Danesh and her husband Rezwanul Haque Idu Chowdhury was a minister and lawmaker. She was elected as a member of the Jatiya Sangsad from Reserved Women's Seat-1 in 1986.

Chowdhury died on 25 December 2019 at the age of 71.

References

People from Thakurgaon District
1940s births
3rd Jatiya Sangsad members
Women members of the Jatiya Sangsad
2019 deaths
Jatiya Party politicians
20th-century Bangladeshi women politicians